Abdelaziz Ben Dhia (19 December 1936, Moknine – 23 February 2015) served as the Tunisian Special Adviser to the President and Spokesman of the Republic under former President Zine El Abidine Ben Ali. In the aftermath of the 2010–2011 Tunisian revolution, he was placed under house arrest.

References

1936 births
2015 deaths
Government ministers of Tunisia
Democratic Constitutional Rally politicians
Alumni of Sadiki College
University of Toulouse alumni